= Johan Pelser =

South African Air Force officer (born 1957)

Johan Daniel Pelser
- Born: 17 August 1957 (age 69)
- Military career
- Allegiance: South Africa
- Branch: South African Air Force
- Service years: 1982 - date
- Rank: Major General
- Commands: Chief Director Force Development and Support

Major General Johan Pelser (born 17 August 1957) is a South African Air Force officer, currently serving as Chief Director Force Development and Support.

== Military service ==
Pelser joined the Air Force in 1982.

== Education ==
Pelser obtained a Masters of Engineering degree from the University of Pretoria in 1997.
